Içana River (río Isana/río Içana in Spanish and Portuguese) is a tributary of the Rio Negro in South America. Its source is in the Guainía Department of Colombia, where it is known as the Isana River. From its source, it flows mostly east until it reaches the border between Colombia and Brazil, where the river forms a small part of the boundary between the two countries. From the border, it flows mostly southeast through Amazonas state until it joins the Rio Negro at Missão Boa Vista.

In Brazil, the river flows through the Alto Rio Negro Indigenous Territory, which was created in 1998.

See also
List of rivers of Amazonas

References

Brazilian Ministry of Transport

Rivers of Amazonas (Brazilian state)
Rivers of Colombia
Border rivers
Geography of Guainía Department
International rivers of South America
Brazil–Colombia border
Tributaries of the Rio Negro (Amazon)